A list of films produced by the Israeli film industry in 2003.

2003 releases

Unknown premiere date

Awards

Notable deaths

 December 13 – David Perlov, Israeli filmmaker. (b. 1930)

See also
2003 in Israel

References

External links
 Israeli films of 2003 at the Internet Movie Database

Israeli
Film
2003